Thomas LeBlanc is a former President of the George Washington University.

Thomas Leblanc or similar may also refer to:
 Thomas Le Blanc (1774–1843), a British lawyer and academic